Yagodino is a rural locality (a village) in Posyolok Urshelsky, Gus-Khrustalny District, Vladimir Oblast, Russia. The population was 13 as of 2010.

Geography 
Yagodino is located 36 km west of Gus-Khrustalny (the district's administrative centre) by road. Tikhonovo is the nearest rural locality.

References 

Rural localities in Gus-Khrustalny District
Sudogodsky Uyezd